Louis Isadore Kahn (born Itze-Leib Schmuilowsky;  – March 17, 1974) was an Estonian-born American architect based in Philadelphia. After working in various capacities for several firms in Philadelphia, he founded his own atelier in 1935. While continuing his private practice, he served as a design critic and professor of architecture at Yale School of Architecture from 1947 to 1957. From 1957 until his death, he was a professor of architecture at the School of Design at the University of Pennsylvania.

Kahn created a style that was monumental and monolithic; his heavy buildings for the most part do not hide their weight, their materials, or the way they are assembled. He was awarded the AIA Gold Medal and the RIBA Gold Medal. At the time of his death he was considered by some as "America's foremost living architect."

Biography

Early life

Louis Kahn, whose original name was Itze-Leib (Leiser-Itze) Schmuilowsky (Schmalowski), was born into a poor Jewish family, at that time in the Russian Empire, but now in Estonia. His exact birthplace is disputed, but it is widely regarded to be Kuressaare, Saaremaa, although some sources mention Pärnu.

He spent his early childhood in Kuressaare on the island of Saaremaa, then part of the Russian Empire's Livonian Governorate. At the age of three, he saw coals in the stove and was captivated by the light of the coal. He put the coal in his apron, which caught on fire and burned his face. He carried these scars for the rest of his life.

In 1906, his family emigrated to the United States, as they feared that his father would be recalled into the military during the Russo-Japanese War. His birth year may have been inaccurately recorded in the process of immigration. According to his son's 2003 documentary film, the family could not afford pencils. They made their own charcoal sticks from burnt twigs so that Louis could earn a little money from drawings. Later he earned money by playing piano to accompany silent movies in theaters. He became a naturalized citizen of the U.S. on May 15, 1914. His father changed their name to Kahn in 1915.

Education
Kahn excelled in art from a young age, repeatedly winning the annual award for the best watercolor by a Philadelphia high school student. He was an unenthusiastic and undistinguished student at Philadelphia Central High School until he took a course in architecture in his senior year, which convinced him to become an architect.  He turned down an offer to go to the Pennsylvania Academy of the Fine Arts to study art under a full scholarship, instead working at a variety of jobs to pay his own tuition for a degree in architecture at the University of Pennsylvania School of Fine Arts.  There, he studied under Paul Philippe Cret in a version of the Beaux-Arts tradition, one that discouraged excessive ornamentation.

Career
After completing his Bachelor of Architecture in 1924, Kahn worked as senior draftsman in the office of the city architect, John Molitor. He worked on the designs for the 1926 Sesquicentennial Exposition.

In 1928, Kahn made a European tour. He was interested particularly in the medieval walled city of Carcassonne, France, and the castles of Scotland, rather than any of the strongholds of classicism or modernism. After returning to the United States in 1929, Kahn worked in the offices of Paul Philippe Cret, his former studio critic at the University of Pennsylvania, and then with Zantzinger, Borie and Medary in Philadelphia.

In 1932, Kahn and Dominique Berninger founded the Architectural Research Group, whose members were interested in the populist social agenda and new aesthetics of the European avant-gardes. Among the projects Kahn worked on during this collaboration are schemes for public housing that he had presented to the Public Works Administration, which supported some similar projects during the Great Depression. They remained unbuilt. 

Among the more important of Kahn's early collaborations was one with George Howe. Kahn worked with Howe in the late 1930s on projects for the Philadelphia Housing Authority and again in 1940, along with German-born architect Oscar Stonorov, for the design of housing developments in other parts of Pennsylvania. A formal architectural office partnership between Kahn and Oscar Stonorov began in February 1942 and ended in March 1947, which produced fifty-four documented projects and buildings.

Kahn did not arrive at his distinctive architectural style until he was in his fifties. Initially working in a fairly orthodox version of the International Style, he was strongly influenced by a stay as architect-in-residence at the American Academy in Rome during 1950, which marked a turning point in his career. After visiting the ruins of ancient buildings in Italy, Greece, and Egypt, he adopted a back-to-the-basics approach. He developed his own style, as influenced by earlier modern movements, but not limited by their sometimes-dogmatic ideologies. In the 1950s and 1960s, as a consultant architect for the Philadelphia City Planning Commission, Kahn developed several plans for the center of Philadelphia that were never executed.

In 1961 he received a grant from the Graham Foundation for Advanced Studies in the Fine Arts to study traffic movement in Philadelphia and to create a proposal for a viaduct system.

He described this proposal at a lecture given in 1962 at the International Design Conference in Aspen, Colorado:

In the center of town the streets should become buildings. This should be interplayed with a sense of movement which does not tax local streets for non-local traffic. There should be a system of viaducts which encase an area which can reclaim the local streets for their own use, and it should be made so this viaduct has a ground floor of shops and usable area. A model which I did for the Graham Foundation recently, and which I presented to Mr. Entenza, showed the scheme.

Kahn's teaching career began at Yale University in 1947. He eventually was named as the Albert F. Bemis Professor of Architecture and Planning at Massachusetts Institute of Technology in 1956. Kahn then returned to Philadelphia to teach at the University of Pennsylvania from 1957 until his death, becoming the Paul Philippe Cret Professor of Architecture. He also was a visiting lecturer at Princeton University School of Architecture from 1961 to 1967.

Awards and honors
Kahn was elected a Fellow in the American Institute of Architects (AIA) in 1953. He was made a member of the National Institute of Arts and Letters in 1964. He was awarded the Frank P. Brown Medal in 1964. In 1965 he was elected into the National Academy of Design as an Associate Academician. He was made a member of the American Academy of Arts and Sciences in 1968 and awarded the AIA Gold Medal, the highest award given by the AIA, in 1971, and the Royal Gold Medal by the Royal Institute of British Architects (RIBA), in 1972. In 1971, he received the Golden Plate Award of the American Academy of Achievement.

Death
In 1974, Kahn died of a heart attack in a restroom at Penn Station in Manhattan. He had just returned from a work trip to India. Owing to police miscommunications in both New York City and Philadelphia, his wife was initially not notified.

Personal life
Kahn had three children with three women. With his wife Esther he had a daughter, Sue Ann. With Anne Tyng, who began her working collaboration and personal relationship with Kahn in 1945, he also had a daughter, Alexandra. When Tyng became pregnant in 1953, to mitigate the scandal, she went to Rome, for the birth of their daughter. With Harriet Pattison, he had a son, Nathaniel Kahn. Anne Tyng was an architect and teacher, while Harriet Pattison was a pioneering landscape architect. Kahn's obituary in The New York Times, written by Paul Goldberger, mentions only Esther and his daughter by her as survivors.

Documentary
In 2003 Nathaniel Kahn released a documentary about his father, My Architect: A Son's Journey. The Oscar-nominated film provides views and insights into Kahn's architecture while exploring him personally through his family, friends and colleagues.

Designs

 Yale University Art Gallery, New Haven, Connecticut (1951–1953), the first significant commission of Louis Kahn. The ceilings, which are three feet (0.9 meters) thick, consist of a grid of triangular openings that draw the eye upward into dimly-lit, three-sided pyramidal spaces.  These exposed spaces provide the means for channeling the heating, cooling, and electrical services throughout the galleries.
 Richards Medical Research Laboratories, University of Pennsylvania, Philadelphia, Pennsylvania (1957–1965), a breakthrough in Kahn's career that helped set new directions for modern architecture with its clear expression of served and servant spaces and its evocation of the architecture of the past.
 The Salk Institute, La Jolla, California (1959–1965) was to be a campus composed of three main clusters: meeting and conference areas, living quarters, and laboratories. Only the laboratory cluster, consisting of two parallel blocks enclosing a water garden, was built. The two laboratory blocks frame a long view of the Pacific Ocean, accentuated by a thin linear fountain that seems to reach for the horizon. It has been named "arguably the defining work" of Kahn.
 First Unitarian Church, Rochester, New York (1959–1969), named as one of the greatest religious structures of the twentieth century by Paul Goldberger, the Pulitzer Prize-winning architectural critic. Tall, narrow window recesses create an irregular rhythm of shadows on the exterior while four light towers flood the sanctuary walls with indirect, natural light.
 Shaheed Suhrawardy Medical College and Hospital, Dhaka, East Pakistan (now Bangladesh)
 Indian Institute of Management, Ahmedabad, in Ahmedabad, India (1961)
 Eleanor Donnelly Erdman Hall, Bryn Mawr College, Bryn Mawr, Pennsylvania (1960-1965), designed as a modern Scottish castle.
 Phillips Exeter Academy Library, Exeter, New Hampshire (1965–1972), awarded the Twenty-five Year Award by the American Institute of Architects in 1997. Its dramatic atrium features enormous circular openings into the book stacks.
 Kimbell Art Museum, Fort Worth, Texas (1967–1972), features repeated bays of cycloid-shaped barrel vaults with light slits along the apex, which bathe the artwork on display in an ever-changing diffuse light.
 Arts United Center, Fort Wayne, Indiana (1973), The only building realized of a ten-building Arts Campus vision, Kahn's only theatre and building in the Midwest
 Hurva Synagogue, Jerusalem, Israel, (1968–1974), unbuilt 
 Yale Center for British Art, Yale University, New Haven, Connecticut (1969–1974)
 Franklin D. Roosevelt Four Freedoms Park, Roosevelt Island, New York (1972–1974), construction completed 2012
Jatiyo Sangshad Bhaban (National Assembly Building) in Dhaka, East Pakistan (now Bangladesh) was Kahn's last project, developed 1962 to 1974. Kahn got the design contract with the help of Muzharul Islam, one of his students at Yale University, who worked with him on the project. The Bangladeshi Parliament building is the centerpiece of the national capital complex designed by Kahn, which includes hostels, dining halls, and a hospital. According to Robert McCarter, author of Louis I. Kahn, "it is one of the twentieth century's greatest architectural monuments, and is without question Kahn's magnum opus."

Timeline of works

All dates refer to the year project commenced
1935 – Jersey Homesteads Cooperative Development, Hightstown, New Jersey
1940 – Jesse Oser House, 628 Stetson Road, Elkins Park, Pennsylvania
1944 – Carver Court, Foundry Street, Coatsville, Pennsylvania
1947 – Phillip Q. Roche House, 2101 Harts Lane, Conshohocken, Pennsylvania
1950 - Morton and Lenore Weiss House, 2935 Whitehall Rd, East Norriton, Pennsylvania
1951 – Yale University Art Gallery, 1111 Chapel Street, New Haven, Connecticut
1952 – City Tower Project, Philadelphia, Pennsylvania (unbuilt)
1954 – Jewish Community Center (including Trenton Bath House), 999 Lower Ferry Road, Ewing, New Jersey
1956 – Wharton Esherick Studio, 1520 Horseshoe Trail, Malvern, Pennsylvania (designed with Wharton Esherick)
1957 – Richards Medical Research Laboratories, University of Pennsylvania, 3700 Hamilton Walk, Philadelphia, Pennsylvania
1957 – Fred E. and Elaine Cox Clever House, 417 Sherry Way, Cherry Hill, New Jersey
1959 – Margaret Esherick House, 204 Sunrise Lane, Chestnut Hill, Philadelphia, Pennsylvania
1958 – Tribune Review Publishing Company Building, 622 Cabin Hill Drive, Greensburg, Pennsylvania
1959 – Salk Institute for Biological Studies, 10 North Torrey Pines Road, La Jolla, California
1959 – First Unitarian Church, 220 South Winton Road, Rochester, New York
1960 – Erdman Hall Dormitories, Bryn Mawr College, Morris Avenue, Bryn Mawr, Pennsylvania
1960 – Norman Fisher House, 197 East Mill Road, Hatboro, Pennsylvania
1961 – Point Counterpoint, a converted barge performance venue used by the American Wind Symphony Orchestra
1961 - Philadelphia's Mikveh Israel, Philadelphia, Pennsylvania (unbuilt)
1961 – Indian Institute of Management, Ahmedabad, India
1962 – Jatiyo Sangshad Bhaban, the National Assembly Building of Bangladesh, Dhaka, Bangladesh
1963 – President's Estate, Islamabad, Pakistan (unbuilt)
1965 – Phillips Exeter Academy Library, Front Street, Exeter, New Hampshire
1966 – Kimbell Art Museum, 3333 Camp Bowie Boulevard, Fort Worth, Texas
1966 – Olivetti-Underwood Factory, Valley Road, Harrisburg, Pennsylvania
1966 - Temple Beth El of Northern Westchester, Chappaqua, New York
1968 – Hurva Synagogue, Jerusalem, Israel (unbuilt)
1969 – Yale Center for British Art, Yale University, 1080 Chapel Street, New Haven, Connecticut
1971 – Steven Korman House, Sheaff Lane, Fort Washington, Pennsylvania
1973 – Arts United Center (Formerly known as the Fine Arts Foundation Civic Center), Fort Wayne, Indiana
1974 – Franklin D. Roosevelt Four Freedoms Park, Roosevelt Island, New York City, completed 2012. 
1976 – Point Counterpoint II, an improved concert venue for the American Wind Symphony Orchestra, is debuted posthumously
1979 – Flora Lamson Hewlett Library of the Graduate Theological Union, Berkeley, California

Legacy

Louis Kahn's work infused the International style with a fastidious, highly personal taste. Isamu Noguchi called him "a philosopher among architects."  He was concerned with creating strong formal distinctions between served spaces and servant spaces. What he meant by servant spaces was not spaces for servants, but rather spaces that serve other spaces, such as stairwells, corridors, restrooms, or any other back-of-house function such as storage space or mechanical rooms. His palette of materials tended toward heavily textured brick and bare concrete, the textures often reinforced by juxtaposition to highly refined surfaces such as travertine marble. Kahn argued that brick can be more than the basic building material:

If you think of Brick, you say to Brick, 'What do you want, Brick?' And Brick says to you, 'I like an Arch.' And if you say to Brick, 'Look, arches are expensive, and I can use a concrete lintel over you. What do you think of that, Brick?' Brick says, 'I like an Arch.' And it's important, you see, that you honor the material that you use. ... You can only do it if you honor the brick and glorify the brick instead of shortchanging it.

Kahn worked closely with engineers and contractors on his buildings. In addition to the influence Kahn's more well-known work has on contemporary architects (such as Muzharul Islam, Tadao Ando), some of his work (especially the unbuilt City Tower Project) became very influential among the high-tech architects of the late twentieth century (such as Renzo Piano, who worked in Kahn's office, Richard Rogers, and Norman Foster). His prominent apprentices include Muzharul Islam, Moshe Safdie, Robert Venturi, Jack Diamond, and Charles Dagit.

Many years after his death, Kahn continues to provoke controversy. Before his Franklin D. Roosevelt Four Freedoms Park at the southern tip of Roosevelt Island was built, a New York Times editorial opined:

There's a magic to the project. That the task is daunting makes it worthy of the man it honors, who guided the nation through the Depression, the New Deal and a world war. As for Mr. Kahn, he died in 1974, as he passed alone through New York City's Penn Station. In his briefcase were renderings of the memorial, his last completed plan.

The editorial describes Kahn's plan as:

... simple and elegant. Drawing inspiration from Roosevelt's defense of the Four Freedoms—of speech and religion, and from want and fear—he designed an open 'room and a garden' at the bottom of the island. Trees on either side form a 'V' defining a green space, and leading to a two-walled stone room at the water's edge that frames the United Nations and the rest of the skyline.

A group spearheaded by William J. vanden Heuvel raised over $50 million in public and private funds between 2005 and 2012 to establish the memorial. Franklin D. Roosevelt Four Freedoms Park officially opened to the public on October 24, 2012.

In popular culture
Kahn was the subject of the 2003 Oscar-nominated documentary film My Architect: A Son's Journey, presented by Nathaniel Kahn, his son. Kahn's complicated family life inspired the "Undaunted Mettle" episode of Law & Order: Criminal Intent.

In the 1993 film Indecent Proposal, character David Murphy (played by Woody Harrelson), referenced Kahn during a lecture to architecture students, attributing the quote "Even a brick wants to be something" to Kahn.

Pulitzer Prize-winning composer Lewis Spratlan, with collaborators Jenny Kallick and John Downey (Amherst College, class of 2003), composed the chamber opera Architect as a character study of Kahn. The premiere recording was due to be released in 2012 by Navona Records.

In Showtime's Billions (Season 4, Episode 6), Taylor Mason and Wendy Rhoades meet at the Franklin D. Roosevelt Four Freedoms Park and discuss Kahn's genius and his relationship with his estranged son.

Gallery

Notes and references

Cited sources

Further reading

Goldhagen, Sarah Williams, Louis Kahn's Situated Modernism (New Haven: Yale University Press, 2001), ISBN 0300077866.
Kahn, Louis. Louis Kahn: Essential Texts, edited by Robert Twombly. London & New York: WW Norton & Company, 2003.
 
 Mowla, Qazi Azizul 2007 Kahn’s Creation in Dhaka – Re Evaluated, Jahangirnagar Planning Review,(Journal: issn=1728-4198).Vol.5, June 2007, Dhaka, pp. 85–96.

Choudhury, Bayezid Ismail 2014. PhD dissertation at the University of Sydney ‘The genesis of Jatio Sangsad Bhaban at Sher-e-Bangla Nagar, Dhaka’
 
 
 Harriet Pattison: Our days are like full years : a memoir with letters from Louis Kahn, New Haven : Yale University Press, [2020],

External links

Louis I. Kahn – Philadelphia Architects and Buildings Project
Exhibition at the University of Pennsylvania on Louis I. Kahn Interiors

Modernist architects from the United States
1901 births
1974 deaths
 
American ecclesiastical architects
Architecture educators
Estonian architects
Jewish architects
Modernist architects
Fellows of the American Institute of Architects
Recipients of the Royal Gold Medal
Architects from Philadelphia
Architecture of Phillips Exeter Academy
American people of Estonian-Jewish descent
Estonian emigrants to the United States
Estonian Jews
Central High School (Philadelphia) alumni
University of Pennsylvania School of Design alumni
University of Pennsylvania faculty
Yale School of Architecture faculty
People from Kuressaare
20th-century American architects
Recipients of the AIA Gold Medal
Olivetti people
Members of the American Academy of Arts and Letters